Fell in Love at 22 is an EP released by the band Starflyer 59 after the release of the band's fourth album, The Fashion Focus. It contains the title track, which appeared on The Fashion Focus, and four other songs, which were recorded at the same time but not included on the album.

Track listing
"Fell in Love at 22" – 2:34
"We Want It Bad" – 4:06
"E.P. Nights" – 3:13
"Traffic Jam" – 14:12
"Samson" – 2:28

Writing Credits
All songs written by Jason Martin

Miscellaneous
At 14 minutes and 12 seconds, the instrumental "Traffic Jam" is the longest track released by Starflyer 59 to date.

References

1999 EPs
Starflyer 59 EPs
Tooth & Nail Records EPs